Metro Police may refer to:

 Metropolitan Police Department of the District of Columbia
 Las Vegas Metropolitan Police Department
 Metropolitan Nashville Police Department
 Metropolitan District Commission Police, one of several Defunct Massachusetts police agencies
 Metropolitan Police Service, the territorial police force responsible for law enforcement in Greater London